Nick Royle (born 1983) is a current England Rugby Sevens International rugby union player.  He plays as a winger.  He is currently playing 15-aside rugby for Caldy in the RFU Championship (tier 2 of the English rugby union league system).  As of 2018 he is the most prolific try scorer ever in National League 2 North with over 190 tries.  Nick has also had success with Lancashire in the Bill Beaumont Cup - winning the competition 3 times.  As well as playing international sevens, he was selected by the England Counties XV.

Career

Rugby league
Educated at Wade Deacon High School in Widnes, Royle has a strong rugby league background emanating from the age of six at local club Halton Hornets. He went on to appear for Widnes Vikings and Warrington Wolves. Nick's best memory before joining England Sevens was a 70-metre try on his Super League debut in a 24-16 Widnes win over Warrington. Royle was noted for his speed, however his defensive frailties were exposed and he chose to move to the 15-a-side code and then onto the Sevens circuit.

Rugby union

In 2002 Nick was playing rugby union for Manchester, then in the second tier of English rugby.  He made a number of league and cup appearances for the club, mostly as a substitute, and scored several tries, in a season which saw Manchester avoid relegation by finishing 12th.  The next season, he dropped several divisions to tier 4 (then known as National 3 North) to spend a year playing for Liverpool St Helens, who unfortunately ended up being relegated from the league.  During the summer of 2004 he switched to rugby league, playing for Super League sides Widnes Vikings and rivals Warrington Wolves.

Despite making a number of appearances in the Super League, Nick decided to return to rugby union for the 2005-06 season and was signed by Premiership side, Sale Sharks, who loaned him out to local Lancashire side, Fylde, who were playing in the fourth division.  He had a great debut season, scoring 16 tries for a Fylde side that finished mid table.  The following year, Nick's performances continued to improve with Fylde as he finished as the league's top try scorer with 31 tries and his club side finished in 5th place.   He also equaled the division's record of seven tries in one game during the 106-0 thrashing of relegated Orrell on 31 March 2007.  The 2007-08 season with Fylde was less prolific for Nick, although he still managed 20 tries in league and cup competitions and Fylde just missed out on a playoff spot when they finished 3rd.  In September 2007 Nick's form saw him picked by the England Counties XV for the FIRA/AER Rugby Festival held in south-west France.  He played in all 3 games at the festival scoring 3 tries.

The next couple of seasons would see Nick continue his prolific try scoring form with Fylde – form which would also see him called up for the England Sevens team in 2009 as well as England Counties and the Barbarians. Previously unknown to most, Royle emerged as a talent on the IRB Sevens World Series scene with four tries in his debut tournament in Dubai in early December 2009 that has led to 29 overall so far. They include four off the bench in the final event of 2009-10 at Murrayfield, one against France in Las Vegas in February this year and another in the USA match in Hong Kong the following month.  In early April, he became the Adelaide tournament's overall leading try-scorer with eight, having bagged successive hat tricks in the opening matches against Scotland and Papua New Guinea before plundering two in the next game against Argentina.  A powerful and irrepressible runner, he even scored in four consecutive matches spanning the Dubai and George tournaments in 2009, a telling tally that introduced him to opposing defences in an exalted competition.

Nick was also involved with the Lancashire country side that won the Bill Beaumont Cup in the summer of 2009 - scoring a try in the 32 - 18 win against Gloucestershire at the final at Twickenham - his 7th of a very successful competition.  A second county championship win with Lancashire would be repeated in the 2010 Bill Beaumont Cup, as Nick played in the 37-27 victory over Cheshire.  He would also be picked by England Counties XV for their 2009 tour of South Korea and Japan - playing all 3 games and scoring 2 tries.

Success at sevens was not mimicked with his professional side, Sale Sharks, as his time there was restricted to a handful of EDF Cup games and appearances for the second team, the Sale Jets.  Despite failing to make his Premiership debut, the 2010-11 season was an excellent one for both Nick and Fylde as he scored 24 tries in a side that finished as champions and were promoted to division 3 (National League 1).  The 2011-12 season would see Nick be called up once more by the England Sevens team, finishing best try scorer of the Sevens Grand Prix Series with 35 tries.  He also mixed international sevens with Fylde, scoring 25 tries for the promoted Lancashire club as they finished 4th in National League 1.

In 2012 Nick decided to leave Fylde on what was initially thought to be a temporary (but financially lucrative) deal to play for the Vale of Lune, a local side which played three divisions below Fylde.  While at the Vale of Lune, Nick broke the club's season try scoring record of 36 set by former player Mark Nelson (got who was also Nick's coach at Fylde) with 38 league tries during the 2013-14 season.  While at Vale of Lune, Nick was also called up to the Lancashire county rugby side, with whom he helped win the 2013 Bill Beaumont Cup (his third successive cup victory for his county), scoring 2 tries as Lancashire defeated Cornwall at the final held at Twickenham, and finishing the tournaments top try scorer with 5.

Ultimately, Nick's try scoring exploits could not gain promotion for the club and he returned to national rugby with Caldy for the 2014-15 season, playing in National League 2 North (tier 4).  Nick finished the 2015-16 season as the division's top try scorer with 25 tries, also becoming the divisions all-time top try scorer.  The 2016-17 season was an extremely successful one for Nick and his club, as he contributed 32 tries to finish once again as the top try scorer in the division for a record breaking 3rd time, and Caldy were promoted to National League 1 as champions - the highest level the club has reached.  The next season he scored 19 tries in National League 1 as Caldy finished their first season in the new division in a respectable 11th place.  Although he had a good second season individually, his tries (20 in all) were not enough to keep Caldy up and they were relegated at the end of 2018-19.

Season-by-season playing stats

Club

County or representative

Honours and records 

National League 2 North
Tier 4 (North) all-time top try scorer (161 tries)
Tier 4 (North) most tries in a match: 7 (tied)

Fylde
National Division 3 North top try scorer: 2006-07 (31 tries)
National League 2 North champions: 2010-11

Vale of Lune
North Division 1 West top try scorer: 2013-14 (38 tries)
Most league tries in a season (38 tries)

Caldy
National League 2 North top try scorer: 2015-16 (25 tries)
National League 2 North champions (2): 2016-17, 2019-20
National League 2 North top try scorer: 2016-17 (32 tries)

Lancashire
Bill Beaumount Cup winner (3): 2009, 2010, 2013
Bill Beaumount Cup runner up: 2012
Bill Beaumount Cup top try scorer: 2013 (5 tries)

International/Representative
Selected for England Counties XV: 2009
Selected for Barbarians: 2009
Selected for England Sevens: 2009, 2011

Notes

References

External links
Sale Sharks profile
RFU England Sevens Profile
Fylde Rugby Profile
Season by Season Playing Record

1983 births
Living people
English rugby union players
Sale Sharks players
Male rugby sevens players
Fylde Rugby Club players
Rugby union players from Widnes
Lancashire County RFU players